Sophia M. DiCaro is a former Republican member of the Utah House of Representatives. She represented House District 31 for one term from January 2015 through January 2017.

Early life and career 
DiCaro grew up in Utah and studied at the University of Utah. She has a bachelor's degree and a Masters of Public Administration. After college she worked in the Governor's Office of Planning and Budget. She is a resident of West Valley City. DiCaro is married and has three children.

Political career 
DiCaro began serving in the House in January 2015. She ran for office in 2014 and beat the Democratic challenger Larry Wiley. 

During the 2016 general session, DiCaro served on the following committees:
 House Health and Human Services Committee
 House Law Enforcement and Criminal Justice Committee
 Social Services Appropriations Committee

Legislation

2016 sponsored bills

Sources

External links 
 Official Page
 Campaign Website
 Biography Project Vote Smart

Living people
Women state legislators in Utah
Republican Party members of the Utah House of Representatives
University of Utah alumni
21st-century American politicians
21st-century American women politicians
American women of Japanese descent in politics
Asian-American people in Utah politics
Year of birth missing (living people)
Asian conservatism in the United States